Our Lady of Good Counsel Church is a Roman Catholic Parish Church in the Dennistoun area of Glasgow, Scotland. It is situated on Craigpark. It is a category A listed building.

History
The church was constructed in 1964-65. The architects were Gillespie, Kidd and Coia. In 1966 they were awarded the bronze regional medal of the RIBA and the Civic Trust Award for this building.

Parish
The church has three Sunday Masses they are at 5:30pm on Saturday, 11:00am and 5:30pm on Sunday. There are also weekday Masses at 10:00am.

See also
 Catholic Church in Scotland
 Roman Catholic Archdiocese of Glasgow

References

Category A listed buildings in Glasgow
Listed Roman Catholic churches in Scotland
Roman Catholic churches in Scotland
Roman Catholic churches in Glasgow
Listed churches in Glasgow
Roman Catholic churches completed in 1965